Sir Frederick Gill Rice (186630 June 1929) was a Conservative MP for Harwich.

A building contractor, he was principal of Rice & Son, building contractors and of Foote, Milne & Co., engineers. He was knighted in 1921.

He stood for Harwich in 1923, won it from the Liberals in 1924, but stood down in 1929.

References 

Conservative Party (UK) MPs for English constituencies
Politicians from Suffolk
UK MPs 1924–1929
1866 births
1929 deaths
Knights Bachelor
British builders
British businesspeople